Syed Shamsul Huda  (1862–1922) was a Muslim political leader of the  Bengal Executive Council. He became the first  British Indian  Muslim President of the Legislative council in 1921. Huda was born in Gokarna, palace known as Gokarna Nawab Bari Complex Nasirnager, Brahmanbaria. It was the part of  Comilla. Earlier known as greater Hill Tipperah. His father Syed Riazat Ullah was the editor of The Doorbeen, a Persian weekly journal.

Education

Syed Shamsul Huda completed primary education at home. His father taught him Arabic, Persian, Urdu, Bengali, and Islamic ideology. For higher education, he went to Hooghly Madrasah at Calcutta. He became a BA from  Presidency College in 1884, a BL from Calcutta University in 1886 and a MA in Persian, privately from Presidency College in 1889.

Huda was a student in many fields of knowledge. He was one of the most articulate Muslims of his age. He became an iconic  British Indian  Muslim scholar, writer, lawyer, powerful leader, and profound politician in the twentieth century.

Career

Syed Shamsul Huda joined the  Calcutta Madrasah  as a lecturer in 1885. He decided to be a lawyer and started practicing in Calcutta High Court in 1887. That lead him to step into politics. The Indian National Congress was established in 1885 and proposed to all Indian people to join despite religions. They succeeded by collecting full support from great Indian Muslim leaders Syed Ahmad Khan, Nawab Abdul Latif, and Syed Ameer Ali. Later for few days, Congress leaders changed their opinion and started partitioning. Muslim leaders called the next Annual Meeting in 1895. Huda addressed to stop this and advised the ways to make a more united and effective Congress. His address is known as Indian Politics and the Muhammadans. Hence, he became at the top of the political body.

Huda opposed the budget for 1905. That was a budget created for the development of colleges, hospitals, and other institutions in Calcutta that was spending East Bengal's revenue. He proposed spending for such institutions in East Bengal for the welfare of East Bengal Muslims. But the elite Hindus highly opposed it. He wrote:

He also mentioned on another occasion:

Authority selected Huda as a fellow of Calcutta University in 1902. He delivered the historical Tagore Law Lecture published in a book named The Principles of the Law of Crimes in British India by Butterworth & Co,(India) Ltd. Jeremy Bentham, William Austin, and William Blackstone influenced him. He presided Muhammadan Educational Conference at Rajshahi in 1904, the East Bengal and Assam Legislative Assembly member in 1908,  the All India Muslim League President in 1910, and Imperial Legislative Council between 1911 and 1915.

Huda was the governor of Bengal's executive council member from 1912 to 1919. Rewarded as the nawab in 1913, KCIE in 1916 and the second judge in Calcutta High Court in 1917 from the East Bengal Muslim justice.

Thomas Gibson-Carmichael stated:

Huda became the first British Indian Muslim president of the reoriented legislative council of East and West Bengal in 1921.

Surendranath Banerjee stated:

Contributions to education

Syed Shamsul Huda created accommodations founding Carmichael Hostel in Calcutta for rural university-going Muslim students of Bengal. He sanctioned two-thirds of funds from the government to establish the Elliot Madrasah Hostel in 1898. Estimated Rs. 5,400 contributed by the Nawab Abdul Latif Memorial Committee. He created the post of "assistant director for Muslim education" for each division.

Huda sanctioned the large sum of Rs. 900,000 from the Bengal government to purchase land to establish a government college for Muslims in Calcutta. The opening ceremony was postponed until 1926 due to the First World War when Abul Kasem Fazl-ul-Haq became education minister of the united province.

Huda founded Gokarna Syed Waliuallah High School naming his same-aged uncle on his paternal property in 1915. It was the first government-aided school in  Nasirnagar for Hindu and Muslim students.

Major elites Hindus like Ashutosh Mukherjee, Shyamaprasad Mukherjee etc. opposed The University of Dhaka Huda's involvement helped it established in 1921. Lawrence Ronaldshay served as chancellor and designated Huda as a life member of the university. Huda recommended A. F. Rahman as a provost and appointed by Lord Ronaldshay.  

Huda funded the journals Sudhakar (1889), The Urdu Guide Press, and The Muhammadan Observer (1880). He prevented religious obligation for women's education in Bengal. He supported and encouraged Begum Rokeya for women's education and development and her Bengal Women's Education Project.

Death
Syed Shamsul Huda lived at 211 Lawyer Circular Road, Calcutta. He died on 14 October 1922 and was buried in Tiljola Municipal graveyard. The Calcutta Weekly Notes wrote of his death:

References

1862 births
1922 deaths
People from Brahmanbaria district
Nawabs of Bengal
Knights Commander of the Order of the Indian Empire
Indian knights
Bengali educators
Bengali politicians
Bengali Muslims
19th-century Bengalis
People from British India
19th-century Indian politicians
19th-century Indian educators
20th-century Indian educators
19th-century Indian educational theorists
Educators from West Bengal